Marie-Louise Butzig (15 November 1944 – 6 March 2017) was a French footballer who played as goalkeeper for French club  Stade de Reims of the Division 1 Féminine. Butzig represented France in the first FIFA sanctioned women's international against the Netherlands, France won 4-0.

Literature
 
 Pascal Grégoire-Boutreau/Tony Verbicaro: Stade de Reims – une histoire sans fin., Cahiers intempestifs, Saint-Étienne 2001, ISBN 2-911698-21-5
 Lucien Perpère/Victor Sinet/Louis Tanguy: Reims de nos amours. 1931/1981 – 50 ans de Stade de Reims., Alphabet Cube, Reims 1981
 Laurence Prudhomme-Poncet: Histoire du football féminin au XXe siècle., L’Harmattan, Paris 2003, ISBN 2-7475-4730-2

References

1944 births
2017 deaths
People from Yonne
Stade de Reims Féminines players
French women's footballers
France women's international footballers
Division 1 Féminine players
Women's association football goalkeepers